Samira Nandi Marques Vera-Cruz (born 11 September 1990) is a Cape Verdean film director, producer, editor and actress.

Biography
Born in São Vicente, Samira Vera-Cruz is a Cape-Verdean film director and producer, with Angolan and Cape Verdean ancestry. She grew up between the cities of Mindelo, Praia and Lisbon, the latter in Portugal.

Samira graduated with a bachelor of arts in Film Studies and a minor in Global Communications at the American University of Paris in 2013.

The director started her professional life as a journalist at Agência Cabo-verdiana de Imagens (ACI = Capeverdean Images Agency) and later as an account manager at Greenstudio, at Praia, Cabo Verde.

She moved to Angola in early 2014 and worked for almost two years as an audiovisual producer for Muxima Filmes in the city of Luanda.

After returning to Cabo Verde,  she worked for a few months at Kriolscope, as executive producer, where she directed her first short film Buska Santu in 2016.  

Buska Santu is a short fiction film, inspired by "The Bicycle Thief" by Vittorio de Sica, and shows us the relationship between a father and his son, in the island of Santiago, Cabo Verde. 
The short film has been screened in Cabo Verde, Portugal, Poland and Mozambique and won the prize for best fiction at the Oiá Film Festival in Mindelo, Cabo Verde.

She then created her production company, Parallax Produções, and with it directed the films Hora di Bai (2017) and Sukuru (2017).

Hora di Bai is a short documentary, financed by the European Union, through the "Short Films PALOP-TL UE 25 years" contest, and talks about the relationship with death in the island of Santiago, Cabo Verde. The film has been screened in festivals in Cabo Verde, Brazil, Canada, United States of America, Portugal, Belgium, Poland, Guinea Bissau, Mozambique, Angola, São Tomé and Principe, Macau, East Timor and Madagascar.

Sukuru, which was made with no financing, is her first feature film. A psychological thriller that tells the story of Jiló, a young schizophrenic man, addicted to crack-cocaine, and his struggle with addiction, his mother and his demons. It has been screened in Cabo Verde, Poland, Brazil, Brussels, Mozambique and Macau.

The young director was selected for Talents Durban 2019, during the Durban International Film Festival, in which she participated with her documentary project "And Who Will Cook?", and received the PR Consulting Award at the end of the residency.

That same year, she participated in FIDADOC's writing residency, in Morocco.

In 2020, the director participated in Durban FilmMart and Ouaga Film Lab with the documentary project "And Who Will Cook?". At the later she won the IDFA and World Cinema Fund/Goethe Institute Awards.

In March 2020, Samira became coordinator of the Film and Audiovisual Network, founded with fellow filmmakers from Cape Verde, Mozambique, Angola, Guinea Bissau and São Tomé and Príncipe, with the aim of promoting production and especially distribution in the region.

Filmography
Busku Santu [Busca Santu] (2016)
Hora di Bai [Time to Go] (2017) 
Sukuru [Darkness''] (2017)

References

1990 births
Living people
Cape Verdean producers
People from Mindelo
American University of Paris alumni
Cape Verdean actresses
21st-century actresses